Ed Oxenbould (born 1 June 2001) is an Australian actor. He rose to prominence for his role in the film Julian (2012). Subsequently, he appeared in the television series Puberty Blues (2012–2014) and became more well-known for his role in the film Alexander and the Terrible, Horrible, No Good, Very Bad Day (2014). He continued to gain fame for his roles in the films Paper Planes (2015), The Visit (2015), Better Watch Out (2016) and Wildlife (2018).

Early life and education
Oxenbould was born in Melbourne, Australia, the son of actors Diane Adams and Jamie Oxenbould. He is the nephew of comedian/actor Ben Oxenbould.

Career
He starred in the 2012 Australian short film Julian, directed by Matthew Moore, in which he played the title role (a 9-year-old Julian Assange). He was nominated for the AACTA Award for Best Young Actor. He then starred in the Australian television show Puberty Blues as David Vickers, a 10-year-old boy.

Oxenbould co-starred as Dylan in the 2014 film Paper Planes along with Sam Worthington, which premiered at the Toronto International Film Festival. On 24 June 2013, Oxenbould was added to the cast of Disney's film Alexander and the Terrible, Horrible, No Good, Very Bad Day, in which he played the title role of Alexander. Miguel Arteta directed the comedy film, which was released on 10 October 2014.

Oxenbould won the Las Vegas Film Critics Society Sierra Award for Best Youth Male Performance for his role in the 2018 American indie film Wildlife.

Filmography

Film

Television

References

External links
 
 

2001 births
Living people
21st-century Australian male actors
Australian male child actors
Australian male film actors
Australian male television actors
Male actors from Melbourne